Richard Magarey (born 3 August 1983) is an Australian stunt actor, professional wrestler, singer and YouTuber, known for his bearded crossdressing persona named . He is currently vocalist of the band BABYBEARD, formerly with the band Ladybaby and Deadlift Lolita.

Early career
According to GirlsWalker, Magarey first started crossdressing when he was 14 years old using his sister's school uniform. Ever since then, cute outfits have been part of his eventual wrestling gimmick.

Magarey graduated from the Flinders University of South Australia Drama Centre in 2004 with a Bachelor of Creative Arts before moving to Melbourne to train in Hong Kong-style martial arts and cinematic stunt work with Paul Andreovski of the Jackie Chan Stunt Team.

Wrestling and acting career
Originally from Adelaide, Magarey moved to Hong Kong in 2006 to kickstart his martial arts stunt career in films, later becoming a hit in Hong Kong as a cross-dressing pro wrestler. He held roles in two Michael Gleissner movies: Irreversi, shot in 2010 in Hong Kong (where Magarey was also the stand-in for lead actor Ian Bohen), and Deep Gold, shot in 2011 in the Philippines. He also starred as the main foreign villain in The Fortune Buddies. In October 2013 he moved to Tokyo, Japan to attempt a similar career there. On January 1, 2015 Ladybeard released the DVD+CD "Ladybeard Justice Fight Ai To Yuki To Bikini To Hige To". In 2017 Ladybeard was part of the Australian documentary "Big in Japan".

In addition to his native English, Ladybeard has conversational levels of Japanese, Cantonese, Mandarin Chinese and can understand some German.

Championships and accomplishments 
 DDT Pro-Wrestling
 Ironman Heavymetalweight Championship (3 times)
 KO-D 10-Man Tag Team Championship (1 time) – with Ken Ohka, LiLiCo, Makoto Oishi and Super Sasadango Machine
 Union Pro Wrestling
 Fly To Everywhere World Championship (1 time)

Music career

Ladybeard's musical style is described as Kawaiicore, a portmanteau of kawaii (Japanese for "cute") and the -core suffix associated with hardcore metal genres. His motto is "Sing, dance, destroy!".

Ladybaby
In 2015, he formed the band with singers Rie Kaneko and  called Ladybaby. On 4 July, the group released their first track and music video titled 'Nippon Manju' ('Japanese Bun', in English) which is a song that covers all the things they love about Japan. Released in July 2015, the music video went viral on YouTube, at one point gathering 1 million views in 2 days. Their second single, released in Japan on 13 January 2016, debuted at number 15 in the daily Oricon charts. Ladybeard has since withdrawn from the group. The group re-branded itself, going by "The Idol Formerly Known as LADYBABY". in 2018, the group returned to the original name after Rei left the group and three other girls joined. Ladybeard did however make a guest appearance on the EP "ホシノナイソラ -Starless_Sky-", providing additional growling vocals on the song "ビリビリマネー -Biri Biri Money-".

Deadlift Lolita

On 28 February 2017, Ladybeard announced the formation of a new group, "Deadlift Lolita", with bodybuilding model and wrestler Reika Saiki. They are joined by guitarist , who also accompanied Babymetal. Their first single "Six Pack Twins" was released on 31 March 2017.

Solo and collaborations
On 1 January 2015 Ladybeard released the single CD bonus of the DVD "LadyBeard Justice Fight – Ai to Yuki to Bikini to Hige to -", with the single and four remixes of the song "Ladybeard Justice Fight". On 20 January 2016 Ladybeard was featured in Shiori Tomita single "Valentine Kiss Cover", version of "Valentine Kiss", from Sayuri Kokushō. On 19 October 2016 Ladybeard released a collaboration single with PEE and Yuuka Furukawa, "Wanchan Aruchan". On 28 October 2016 he released a collaboration single with the Chinese idol group ATF, "Ghost Script". On 23 May 2018 he released a collaboration single with the drummer MURATA TAMU, "Super D & D ~Kanzen ni Lead Shite I My Me~", with "D zettai! Samurai in the rain" as b-side. On 7 July 2020 he made screams in the single from Zakk Cash "Limit Break X Survivor (Dragon Ball Super Collaborative Cover) (feat. Amalee, Ladybeard, Samuel Cristea, Eric Emery, Julian Comeau, Mark Barela, Callgirl & Christian Grey"). All the proceeds from streams are going to Action Against Hunger, supporting victims of the Aussie bushfires, and those most affected by Covid.

BABYBEARD 
On April 12, 2021, Ladybeard announced the formation of a new group called BABYBEARD with singers Suzu and Kotomi. Their debut releases "Nippon Kara Konnichiwa" and "PIENIZER" began streaming on April 28, 2021. "Nippon Kara Konnichiwa" reached iTunes Store • J-Pop Top Songs • Australia • TOP 2 on April 28, 2021 and iTunes Store • J-Pop Top Songs • America • TOP 4 on April 29, 2021. Songs for the group were written by Takashi Asano and Natsumi Tadano, the writers of Ladybaby's "Nippon Manju".

See also

 Exótico
 Kawaii metal
 Cat with Brard from JAPAN PODCAST

References

External links
 
 

1983 births
Living people
Australian male professional wrestlers
Sportspeople from Adelaide
Sportsmen from South Australia
Australian expatriate sportspeople in Hong Kong
Australian expatriate sportspeople in Japan
Expatriate professional wrestlers in Japan
Musicians from Adelaide
Australian heavy metal singers
Male-to-female cross-dressers
Kawaii metal musicians
21st-century Australian singers
21st-century Australian male singers
Fly To Everywhere World Champions
Ironman Heavymetalweight Champions
KO-D 8-Man/10-Man Tag Team Champions